Capperia jozana is a moth of the family Pterophoridae. It is known from Hokkaido island Japan.

The length of the forewings is 7–8 mm.

External links
Taxonomic And Biological Studies Of Pterophoridae Of Japan (Lepidoptera)
Japanese Moths

Oxyptilini
Moths of Japan
Moths described in 1931
Taxa named by Shōnen Matsumura